In linear algebra, the trace of a square matrix , denoted , is defined to be the sum of elements on the main diagonal (from the upper left to the lower right) of . The trace is only defined for a square matrix.

It can be proved that the trace of a matrix is the sum of its (complex) eigenvalues (counted with multiplicities). This implies that similar matrices have the same trace. As a consequence one can define the trace of a linear operator mapping a finite-dimensional vector space into itself, since all matrices describing such an operator with respect to a basis are similar.

The trace is related to the derivative of the determinant (see Jacobi's formula).

Definition 
The trace of an  square matrix  is defined as

The entries of  can be real numbers or (more generally) complex numbers. The trace is not defined for non-square matrices.

Expressions like , where  is a square matrix, occur so often in some fields (e.g. multivariate statistical theory), that a shorthand notation has become common:

 is sometimes referred to as the exponential trace function; it is used in the Golden–Thompson inequality.

Example 
Let  be a matrix, with

Then

Properties

Basic properties 
The trace is a linear mapping. That is,

A matrix and its transpose have the same trace:

This follows immediately from the fact that transposing a square matrix does not affect elements along the main diagonal.

Trace of a product 
The trace of a square matrix which is the product of two real matrices can be rewritten as the sum of entry-wise products of their elements, i.e. as the sum of all elements of their Hadamard product.

According to the above expression,  is a sum of squares and hence is nonnegative, equal to zero if and only if  is zero. Furthermore, as noted in the above formula, . This is a natural inner product on the vector space of all real matrices of fixed dimensions. The norm derived from this inner product is called the Frobenius norm, and it satisfies a submultiplicative property, as can be proven with the Cauchy–Schwarz inequality:

The Frobenius inner product and norm arise frequently in matrix calculus and statistics.

The Frobenius inner product may be extended to a hermitian inner product on the complex vector space of all complex matrices of a fixed size, by replacing  by its complex conjugate.

The symmetry of the Frobenius inner product may be phrased more directly as follows: the matrices in the trace of a product can be switched without changing the result.

This is notable both for the fact that  does not usually equal , and also since the trace of either does not usually equal . The similarity-invariance of the trace, meaning that  for any square matrix  and any invertible matrix  of the same dimensions, is a fundamental consequence. This is proved by

Similarity invariance is the crucial property of the trace in order to discuss traces of linear transformations as below.

Cyclic property 
More generally, the trace is invariant under cyclic permutations, that is,

This is known as the cyclic property.

Arbitrary permutations are not allowed: in general,

However, if products of three symmetric matrices are considered, any permutation is allowed, since:

where the first equality is because the traces of a matrix and its transpose are equal. Note that this is not true in general for more than three factors.

Trace of a Kronecker product 
The trace of the Kronecker product of two matrices is the product of their traces:

Characterization of the trace
The following three properties:

For  matrices, imposing the normalization  makes  equal to the trace.

Trace as the sum of eigenvalues
Given any  real or complex matrix , there is

where  are the eigenvalues of  counted with multiplicity. This holds true even if  is a real matrix and some (or all) of the eigenvalues are complex numbers. This may be regarded as a consequence of the existence of the Jordan canonical form, together with the similarity-invariance of the trace discussed above.

Trace of commutator
One can state this as "the trace is a map of Lie algebras  from operators to scalars", as the commutator of scalars is trivial (it is an Abelian Lie algebra). In particular, using similarity invariance, it follows that the identity matrix is never similar to the commutator of any pair of matrices.

Conversely, any square matrix with zero trace is a linear combinations of the commutators of pairs of matrices. Moreover, any square matrix with zero trace is unitarily equivalent to a square matrix with diagonal consisting of all zeros.

Traces of special kinds of matrices
 The trace of the  identity matrix is the dimension of the space, namely .

This leads to generalizations of dimension using trace.
 The trace of a Hermitian matrix is real, because the elements on the diagonal are real.
 The trace of a permutation matrix is the number of fixed points of the corresponding permutation, because the diagonal term  is 1 if the th point is fixed and 0 otherwise.
The trace of a projection matrix is the dimension of the target space.

The matrix  is idempotent.
 The trace of a nilpotent matrix is zero.
 When the characteristic of the base field is zero, the converse also holds: if  for all , then  is nilpotent.

Relationship to eigenvalues 

This follows from the fact that  is always similar to its Jordan form, an upper triangular matrix having  on the main diagonal.

Derivative relationships 
If  is a square matrix with small entries and  denotes the identity matrix, then we have approximately

Precisely this means that the trace is the derivative of the determinant function at the identity matrix. Jacobi's formula 

is more general and describes the differential of the determinant at an arbitrary square matrix, in terms of the trace and the adjugate of the matrix.

From this (or from the connection between the trace and the eigenvalues), one can derive a relation between the trace function, the matrix exponential function, and the determinant:

A related characterization of the trace applies to linear vector fields. The components of this vector field are linear functions (given by the rows of ).

The trace is a linear operator, hence it commutes with the derivative:

Trace of a linear operator 
The result will not depend on the basis chosen, since different bases will give rise to similar matrices, allowing for the possibility of a basis-independent definition for the trace of a linear map.

Then the trace of the indecomposable element  is defined to be ; the trace of a general element is defined by linearity.

Numerical algorithms

Stochastic estimator 

More sophisticated stochastic estimators of trace have been developed.

Applications 
If a 2 x 2 real matrix has zero trace, its square is a diagonal matrix.

The trace of a 2 × 2 complex matrix is used to classify Möbius transformations. First, the matrix is normalized to make its determinant equal to one. Then, if the square of the trace is 4, the corresponding transformation is parabolic. If the square is in the interval , it is elliptic. Finally, if the square is greater than 4, the transformation is loxodromic. See classification of Möbius transformations.

The trace is used to define characters of group representations. Two representations  of a group  are equivalent (up to change of basis on ) if  for all .

The trace also plays a central role in the distribution of quadratic forms.

Lie algebra 

The special linear group consists of the matrices which do not change volume, while the special linear Lie algebra is the matrices which do not alter volume of infinitesimal sets.

In fact, there is an internal direct sum decomposition  of operators/matrices into traceless operators/matrices and scalars operators/matrices. The projection map onto scalar operators can be expressed in terms of the trace, concretely as:

Dividing by  makes this a projection, yielding the formula above.

In terms of short exact sequences, one has

which is analogous to

(where ) for Lie groups. However, the trace splits naturally (via  times scalars) so , but the splitting of the determinant would be as the th root times scalars, and this does not in general define a function, so the determinant does not split and the general linear group does not decompose:

Bilinear forms 
The bilinear form (where ,  are square matrices)

is called the Killing form, which is used for the classification of Lie algebras.

The trace defines a bilinear form:

The form is symmetric, non-degenerate and associative in the sense that:

For a complex simple Lie algebra (such as ), every such bilinear form is proportional to each other; in particular, to the Killing form.

The bilinear form

is symmetric and invariant due to cyclicity.

Generalizations 
The concept of trace of a matrix is generalized to the trace class of compact operators on Hilbert spaces, and the analog of the Frobenius norm is called the Hilbert–Schmidt norm.

If  is a trace-class operator, then for any orthonormal basis , the trace is given by

and is finite and independent of the orthonormal basis.

The partial trace is another generalization of the trace that is operator-valued.

For more properties and a generalization of the partial trace, see traced monoidal categories.

Such a trace is not uniquely defined; it can always at least be modified by multiplication by a nonzero scalar.

A supertrace is the generalization of a trace to the setting of superalgebras.

The operation of tensor contraction generalizes the trace to arbitrary tensors.

Traces in the language of tensor products
Given a vector space , there is a natural bilinear map  given by sending  to the scalar .

Similarly, there is a natural bilinear map  given by sending  to the linear map . The universal property of the tensor product, just as used previously, says that this bilinear map is induced by a linear map . If  is finite-dimensional, then this linear map is a linear isomorphism. This linear functional is exactly the same as the trace.

Using the definition of trace as the sum of diagonal elements, the matrix formula  is straightforward to prove, and was given above. Then

The rank-one linear map  has trace  and so

As such, the proof may be written in the notation of tensor products. One may also consider the bilinear map  given by sending  to the composition , which is then induced by a linear map . It can be seen that this coincides with the linear map . The established symmetry upon composition with the trace map then establishes the equality of the two traces.

For any finite dimensional vector space , there is a natural linear map ; in the language of linear maps, it assigns to a scalar  the linear map . Sometimes this is called coevaluation map, and the trace  is called evaluation map. These structures can be axiomatized to define categorical traces in the abstract setting of category theory.

See also 
 Trace of a tensor with respect to a metric tensor
 Characteristic function
 Field trace
 Golden–Thompson inequality
 Singular trace
 Specht's theorem
 Trace class
 Trace identity
 Trace inequalities
 von Neumann's trace inequality

Notes

References

External links 
 

Linear algebra
Matrix theory
Trace theory